Larviksfjorden is a fjord in the municipality of Larvik in Vestfold, Norway. The fjord has a length of about eight kilometers, and is about three kilometer wide at the mouth. The rivers Numedalslågen and Farriselva both discharge into the fjord. The towns Stavern and Larvik both border to the fjord. The two lighthouses Stavernsodden and Svenner are located near the mouth of the fjord.

References

Fjords of Vestfold og Telemark